In the folklore of Bali, the Leyak locally  is a mythological figure in the form of a flying head with entrails (heart, lung, liver, etc.) still attached. Leyak is said to fly trying to find a pregnant woman in order to suck her baby's blood or a newborn child. There are three legendary Leyak, two females and one male.

Description 

Leyaks are humans who are practicing black magic and have cannibalistic behavior. Their mistress is the "queen of Leyak", a widow-witch named Rangda, who plays a prominent role in public rituals. Her mask is kept in the village death temple and during her temple festivals, she is paraded. Besides Leyaks, demons are said to be the followers of Rangda.

Leyak are said to haunt graveyards, feed on corpses, have power to change themselves into animals, such as pigs, and fly. In normal Leyak form, they are said to have an unusually long tongue and large fangs. In daylight they appear as an ordinary human, but at night their head and entrails break loose from their body and fly. Leyak statues (a head with a very long tongue and sharp fangs) are sometimes hung on a wall for house decoration.

In practice, Balinese people sometimes attribute certain illness or deaths to Leyaks. A balian (Balinese traditional healer) will conduct a séance to identify with witchcraft who is responsible for the death. During the séance, the spirit of the dead will directly or indirectly point to their attacker. However, vengeance by the victim's relatives or family is usually counseled against, and people are advised to leave any action to the spirits themselves. Hence, the suspicions and fears of the family and relatives are confirmed, but revenge upon the witch is discouraged by the healers.

See also 
 Flying Head
 Krasue
 Manananggal
Mystics in Bali
 Penanggalan
 Kuntilanak

References 

Indonesian legendary creatures
Balinese mythology
Balinese folklore
Mythological hematophages
Mythological monsters